Iván Nadal  (born 18 May 1987) is an Argentine footballer who plays for Platense in the Primera B Metropolitana. He began his career in Talleres (RE), then he played for Club Atlético Huracán in the Primera División Argentina, FK Ventspils in Latvia and in 2010 he join for Aldosivi in Mar del Plata.

References

External links
 BDFA profile

1987 births
Living people
Footballers from Buenos Aires
Talleres de Remedios de Escalada footballers
Argentine footballers
Club Atlético Huracán footballers
Aldosivi footballers
FK Ventspils players
Defensores de Belgrano footballers
Expatriate footballers in Latvia
Association football defenders